The 1963 Texas Longhorns baseball team represented the University of Texas at Austin in the 1963 NCAA University Division baseball season. The Longhorns played their home games at Clark Field. The team was coached by Bibb Falk in his 21st season at Texas.

The Longhorns reached the College World Series, finishing tied for third with losses to eventual runner-up Arizona and third-place Missouri.

Personnel

Roster

Schedule and results

References

Texas Longhorns baseball seasons
Texas Longhorns
Southwest Conference baseball champion seasons
College World Series seasons
Texas Longhorns